Alexis Martial (born 15 June 2001) is a French professional footballer who plays as a defender.

Personal life
Martial is the cousin of Manchester United forward Anthony Martial, and Johan Martial.

Career statistics

Club

Notes

References

2001 births
Footballers from Paris
Living people
French footballers
Association football defenders
Olympique Lyonnais players
Servette FC players
Championnat National 2 players
Swiss Super League players
2. Liga Interregional players
French expatriate footballers
Expatriate footballers in Switzerland
French expatriate sportspeople in Switzerland